Abdul Jabbar al-Oqaidi (also spelled al-Aqidi or al-Okaidi) is a former commander and spokesman for the Free Syrian Army in Aleppo. A former colonel in the Syrian Arab Army, he defected in early 2012. On 3 November 2013, he announced his resignation from the Aleppo Revolutionary Military Council due to disunity among the rebels and constant retreats from battles, including the Aleppo offensive (October–December 2013).

References

Living people
Syrian colonels
Defectors to the Free Syrian Army
Year of birth missing (living people)